K Bank (Hangul: 케이뱅크), is an online bank based in South Korea. Its largest owner is the telecommunications company, KT Corporation.

History
K Bank launched in 2017, when both KT and Kakao were given licenses to launch Internet-only banks in Korea. K Bank was the first to launch, becoming the first new bank to launch in two decades. During its launch, the bank was able to attract 250,000 new customers in its first two weeks.

In May 2021, MBK Partners and Bain Capital invested 200 billion won each in K bank to become the second largest shareholders of the bank.

In September 2022, K bank received approval for its initial public offering on the Korea Exchange although timing had not been determined yet.

Services
Since its launch, the bank has offered the same products as traditional banks from offering debit cards to offer small loans to consumers.

References

External links

Official website

Online banks
Banks established in 2016
Banks of South Korea
South Korean companies established in 2016